Summit Lake is a lake in the Magpie River system in Unorganized North Part of Algoma District, Ontario, Canada in the Lake Superior drainage basin. There are no significant inflows, and the primary outflow is an unnamed creek to Bog Lake, which eventually flows via Josephine Creek and the Magpie River into Lake Superior. The Algoma Central Railway branch line to Michipicoten makes a loop, between Hawk Junction and Magpie, south of the lake.

See also
List of lakes in Ontario

References

Lakes of Algoma District